Embrace the Middle East is a charity, originally founded in 1854 as a Christian  mission to the Ottoman Empire and now active in the successor states with projects in healthcare, education and community development.

History
The society was set up in 1854 by a group of English evangelical philanthropists including Sir Culling Eardley and Lord Shaftesbury as the Turkish Missions' Aid Society, its purpose being to support Armenian Christians in Turkey. A supporter magazine, The Star in the Eastl was first published in 1883.

In 1893, as its activities outside Turkey developed, the society changed its name to Bible Lands Missions Aid Society. In 1962 it changed its name again to Bible Lands Society, then in 1996 to BibleLands and finally in 2012 to Embrace the Middle East.

Archives of the society are held at the Cadbury Research Library, University of Birmingham.

Political stance
Embrace is broadly sympathetic to the cause of the Palestinians and has been attacked as such by NGO Monitor. But one must question the objectivity of NGO Monitor's statements due to its pro-Israeli tendencies.

References

Christian charities based in the United Kingdom
Religious organizations established in 1854
Christian organizations established in the 19th century
1854 establishments in the United Kingdom